The Pagasetic Gulf is a rounded gulf (max. depth 102 metres) in the Magnesia regional unit (east central Greece) that is formed by the Mount Pelion peninsula.  It is connected with the Euboic Sea. The passage into the Euboic Sea is narrow and is about 4 km.

Its main port is Volos.

Mythology and history
The gulf is named after its historic major port, Pagasae, from which mythology says that Jason built his ship the Argo and from which he sailed on his adventurous voyage.

The gulf's name in Latin was Pagasaeus Sinus.

Places within the gulf
In clockwise order:
Amaliapolis, W, port
Alos, W, no port
Almyros, W, no port
Nea Anchialos, NW, beach, port,
Pagasae, NW, no port
Demetrias, NW, no port
Iolkos, NW, no port
Volos, N, main port
Agria, NE, beach, port
Neochori, E, no port,
Argalasti, E, no port, beaches (Lefokastro, Kalamos, Horto)
 Milina, SE, no port, beaches
Trikeri, S, port at Agia Kyriaki, beaches

The gulf took its name from the ancient city of Pagasae.

References

Gulfs of the Aegean Sea
Gulfs of Greece
Landforms of Magnesia (regional unit)